The Greek algyroides (Algyroides moreoticus) is a species of lizard in the family Lacertidae.

Geographic range
A. moreoticus is endemic to Greece.

Habitat
The natural habitats of A. moreoticus are temperate forests, temperate shrubland, and plantations .

Conservation status
A. moreoticus is threatened by habitat loss.

References

Further reading
Arnold EN, Burton JA (1978). A Field Guide to the Reptiles and Amphibians of Britain and Europe. London: Collins. 272 pp. + Plates 1-40. . (Algyroides moreoticus, p. 118 + Plate 18 + Map 57).
Boulenger GA (1887). Catalogue of the Lizards in the British Museum (Natural History). Second Edition. Volume III. Lacertidæ ... London: Trustees of the British Museum (Natural History). (Taylor and Francis, printers). xii + 575 pp. + Plates I-XL. ("Algiroides [sic] moreoticus ", p. 45).

Algyroides
Endemic fauna of Greece
Lizards of Europe
Reptiles described in 1833
Taxa named by Gabriel Bibron
Taxa named by Jean Baptiste Bory de Saint-Vincent
Taxonomy articles created by Polbot